The Four Owls, or simply The Owls is a British hip hop group formed in 2011.

The group is signed to English label High Focus Records and is composed entirely of previously established High Focus members under bird-themed aliases: Fliptrix (Big Owl), Verb T (Bird T), BVA (Rusty Take-Off), and Leaf Dog (Deformed Wing).

The Owls released their third album, Nocturnal Instinct, on the 17th of April 2020. The album featured US legends DJ Premier, R.A. the Rugged Man and Kool G Rap, among others.

Discography

Albums

Singles 

 Think Twice (Prod. DJ Premier)

References

English hip hop groups
Musical groups established in 2011
2011 establishments in the United Kingdom